Mobile virtual network operators (MVNOs) in Ireland lease wireless telephone and data spectrum from major carriers such as Vodafone, Eir, and Three for resale. As of Q1 2022, the market share of MVNOs in Ireland is 13.4%, including Tesco Mobile with 7.7% and Virgin Mobile with 2.4%.

Active operators

Defunct operators

References 

Mobile virtual network operators
Telecommunications lists
Lists of mobile phone companies